Joseph Patrick Breen (born October 26, 1960) is an American actor, screenwriter, and director.

Early life
Breen was born in Brooklyn, New York, on October 26, 1960.

Career
He has acted primarily on TV but has also appeared in numerous films, as well as on Broadway and Off Broadway.

In 2010, he starred on Broadway in Next Fall. He is currently playing Andrew Munsey, Director of the Central Intelligence Agency, on the CBS drama Madam Secretary.

He voiced all the characters in Britt Allcroft's television series Magic Adventures of Mumfie, and was originally hired to voice Splatter and Dodge in Thomas and the Magic Railroad, but the roles were instead recast to Neil Crone and Kevin Frank.

Breen appeared regularly in Netflix's adaptation of A Series of Unfortunate Events, which premiered in 2017.

Personal life
In a July 2012 interview with Metro Weekly Patrick Breen stated, "I identify as one of the LGBT people" and agreed with the interviewer who referred to Breen coming out as bisexual.

Filmography

Film

Television
{| class="wikitable sortable"
|-
! Year
! Title 
! Role 
! class="unsortable"|Notes 
|-
| 1986
| Spenser: For Hire
| Bobby Olak
| Episode: "And Give Up Show Biz?"
|-
| 1987
| My Sister Sam
| Scotty
| Episode: "Club Dread"
|-
| 1987
| The Cavanaughs
| Tommy
| Episode: "The Arrangement"
|-
| 1987
| Gimme a Break!
| Keith Dudley
| Episode: "Parents' Week: Parts 1 & 2"
|-
| 1987
| 21 Jump Street
| Johnny Hartman
| Episode: "Low and Away"
|-
| 1988
| Just in Time
| Nick Thompson
| Main role
|-
| 1988
| Annie McGuire
| George
| Episode: "The Legend of the Bad Fish"
|-
| 1990
| Monsters| Danny
| Episode: "Museum Hearts"
|-
| 1990
| Kojak: None So Blind| Reporter #1
| TV movie
|-
| 1991
| Sunday Dinner| Kenneth Benedict
| Main role
|-
| 1992
| Fool's Fire| The Ministers
| TV movie 
|-
| 1993
| Melrose Place| Cameron
| 3 episodes (season 1)
|-
| 1993
| Fallen Angels| Doc
| Episode: "The Quiet Room"
|-
| 1993
| Big Wave Dave's| Richie Lamonica
| Main role
|-
| 1994–1998
| Magic Adventures of Mumfie| Narrator
| Main voice role
|-
| 1995–1996
| Simon| Mitch
| Main role
|-
| 1996
| Law & Order| Andrew Gellis
| Episode: "Slave"
|-
| 1996–1997
| One Life to Live| Winslow Freeman
| 2 episodes
|-
| 1998
| Jenny| Richard Marino
| Episode: "A Girl's Gotta Merger"
|-
| 1998
| Party of Five| Kevin Quoss
| Episodes: "Of Human Bonding", "Here and Now"
|-
| 1999
| Oz| Robbie Gerth
| Episodes: "Napoleon's Boney Parts", "Legs"
|-
| 1999
| Sex and the City| Dr. Bradley Meego
| Episode: "Twenty-Something Girls vs. Thirty-Something Women"
|-
| 2001
| Jack & Jill| Ken
| Episodes: "Caution: Parents Crossing", "And Jack and Jill Came Down the Hill"
|-
| 2001
| Ally McBeal| Kevin Stoller
| Episode: "In Search of Barry White"
|-
| 2001
| Frasier| Phillip
| Episode: "A Day in May"
|-
| 2001
| Judging Amy| D.A. Levy
| Episode: "The Last Word"
|-
| 2001
| The Tick| Friendly Fire
| Episode: "Couples"
|-
| 2001
| Will & Grace| Mitchell
| Episode: "Stakin' Care of Business"
|-
| 2001
| Kristin| Nicholas Dupres
| Episode: "The Rift"
|-
| 2002
| Angel| Nev
| Episode: "Birthday"
|-
| 2002
| The West Wing| Kevin Kahn
| Episode: "The Black Vera Wang"
|-
| 2002
| Do Over| Mr. Jenkins
| Episode: "Investing in the Future"
|-
| 2003–2004
| Rock Me Baby| Richard Crandall
| Recurring role, 5 episodes
|-
| 2003–2004
| Joan of Arcadia| Sammy
| 3 episodes
|-
| 2002, 2004
| Law & Order| Kevin Hobart
| Episodes: "The Ring", "Married with Children"
|-
| 2004
| Monk| Jeffery Sweeney
| Episode: "Mr. Monk Gets Married"
|-
| 2004–2005
| Kevin Hill| George Weiss
| Main role
|-
| 2006
| CSI: Crime Scene Investigation| Mr. Phillipe
| Episode: "Way to Go"
|-
| 2006
| Boston Legal| A.D.A. Otto Beedle
| 3 episodes (season 3)
|-
| 2007
| The New Adventures of Old Christine| Edmund
| Episode: "Strange Bedfellows"
|-
| 2007
| Notes from the Underbelly| Pale Husband
| Episode: Pilot
|-
| 2007
| Pushing Daisies| Leo Gaswint
| Episode: "Pie-lette"
|-
| 2008
| Eli Stone| Paul Sweren
| 3 episodes
|-
| 2008
| ER| Felix
| Episode: "Another Thursday at County"
|-
| 2009
| Captain Cook's Extraordinary Atlas| Phinneas Malloy
| TV movie
|-
| 2009
| Ghost Whisperer| Duff Faraday
| Episode: "Stage Fright"
|-
| 2009
| Three Rivers| Dr. Joseph Breen
| Episode: "Good Intentions"
|-
| 2010
| Nurse Jackie| Martin
| Episode: "Apple Bong"
|-
| 2010–2011, 2016
| The Good Wife| Lt. Terrence Hicks
| 3 episodes
|-
| 2011–2015
| Whole Day Down| Patrick Breen
| Web series; also co-creator and writer
|-
| 2012
| CSI: Miami| Henry Duncan
| Episode: "No Good Deed"
|-
| 2013
| Criminal Minds| Peter Harper
| Episode: "The Gathering"
|-
| 2013
| Major Crimes| Dr. Jason Field / Jim Gilmer
| Episode: "D.O.A."
|-
| 2014
| Blue Bloods| Joseph Scott
| Episode: "Open Secrets"
|-
| 2014
| Those Who Kill| Burkhart
| Episode: "Insomnia"
|-
| 2014
| Royal Pains| Bob
| Recurring role (season 6), 6 episodes
|-
| 2014
| The Mysteries of Laura| Erik Walden
| Episode: Pilot
|-
| 2014–2015
| Madam Secretary| Andrew Munsey
| Recurring role (season 1), 10 episodes
|-
| 2015
| The Slap| Malcolm
| Episode: "Connie"
|-
| 2015
| Elementary| Vance Ford
| Episode: "T-Bone and the Iceman"
|-
| 2015
| Show Me a Hero| Paul W. Pickelle
| 2 episodes
|-
| 2016
| Law & Order: Special Victims Unit| Doug Nelson
| Episode: "Forty-One Witnesses"
|-
| 2016
| BrainDead| Cole Stockwell
| 3 episodes
|-
| 2017
| Conviction| Clark Sims
| Episode: "Black Orchid"
|-
| 2017
| The Blacklist: Redemption| James Burton
| Episode: "Hostages"
|-
| 2017–2019
| A Series of Unfortunate Events| Larry Your-Waiter
| Recurring role
|-
| 2021
| The Bite| Agent Kermit Rimland
| Episodes: "The Fourth Wave", "The Fifth Wave"
|}

Stage workBrighton Beach Memoirs (1983)The Substance of Fire (1991)Fuddy Meers (1999)Next Fall (2009, Off Broadway; 2010, Broadway)The Normal Heart (2011, Broadway)The Perplexed'' (2020, Broadway)

References

External links

 Profile, tvguide.com
 Profile, starpulse.com

1960 births
Living people
Writers from Brooklyn
People from Staten Island
American male television actors
American male film actors
American male stage actors
American male voice actors
20th-century American male actors
21st-century American male actors
Bisexual male actors
20th-century American dramatists and playwrights
American LGBT screenwriters
American LGBT dramatists and playwrights
LGBT people from New York (state)
American male screenwriters
Male actors from New York City
American male dramatists and playwrights
20th-century American male writers
Screenwriters from New York (state)
American bisexual actors
American bisexual writers